Guillermo Alvarez (born October 24, 1982) is a retired American gymnast.  He was a member of the 2006 and 2007 World Championship teams.  In 2008, he just missed the Olympics, finishing 6th in the all around and 3rd on pommel horse, but not earning a selection. In college, Alvarez competed for the Minnesota Golden Gophers and was the 2005 Nissen Award winner (the "Heisman" of men's gymnastics).

Alvarez is the cousin of professional wrestler, mixed martial artist , combat sports journalist & podcaster Bryan Alvarez.

References

1982 births
Living people
University of Minnesota alumni
American male artistic gymnasts
Gymnasts at the 2007 Pan American Games
Pan American Games medalists in gymnastics
Pan American Games silver medalists for the United States
Pan American Games bronze medalists for the United States
20th-century American people
21st-century American people